John McMahon "Mac" Hill (22 March 1925 – 24 September 1995) was an Australian rules footballer who played with Collingwood in the Victorian Football League (VFL).		

Originally from Beechworth where he won their 1947 best and fairest award, he then played in an Ovens & King Football League premiership with Wangaratta Rovers FC in 1948 & then played in an Ovens & Murray Football League premiership with Wangaratta FC in 1949, before playing with Collingwood in 1950. 

He returned to play with Wangaratta Rovers in the early 1950s, before coaching Glenrowan FC from 1954 to 1958, including their 1955 Benallla & District Football League premiership. He also won the Benalla & District FL best & fairest Medal in 1957.

Hill served in the Royal Australian Air Force from 1943 to 1946.

Notes

External links 

Jack Hill's profile at Collingwood Forever
1950's - Wangaratta Technical School staff photo

Australian rules footballers from Victoria (Australia)
Collingwood Football Club players
Wangaratta Rovers Football Club players
Wangaratta Football Club players
1925 births
1995 deaths